All Saints' Cathedral, Kampala is an Anglican cathedral in Uganda. It is the seat of the bishop of Kampala, who serves concurrently as the archbishop of Uganda. The existing cathedral dates to the early 20th century, while a much larger modern cathedral building remains under construction.

History 

All Saints' Cathedral was founded in Kampala's Nakasero neighborhood as a chaplaincy to Kampala's colonial hospital in 1912, primarily serving expatriate European Anglicans. In 1962, after Ugandan independence, the church received parish status and membership began to include worshipers of African and Asian origins. In 1972, as the Church of Uganda continued to grow, All Saints' became the pro-cathedral of the Diocese of Kampala, which was formed out of the Diocese of Namirembe. 

In 2019, Rebecca Nyegenye was installed by Archbishop Stanley Ntagali as the first female cathedral provost in the Church of Uganda.

Construction of new cathedral 

In the late 1990s, All Saints' congregation began to outpace its space; by 2011, it had 10,000 members for a church that could seat 800 and the cathedral accommodated overflow crowds in tents on the cathedral close. 

To accommodate future growth, church leaders began planning for a new cathedral building. In 2004, a committee was established, and by 2008, land across Lugard Road from the existing cathedral had been purchased. Plans were made for a post-modern six-sided cathedral building that would include a 45-meter bell tower echoing architectural features of the original cathedral costing £6.6 million. The new building is set to include seating for 4,000 on the main level and two galleries, a two-level underground garage, two chapels, offices and meeting space. 

Construction has proceeded slowly as funds have been raised. Groundbreaking was done in 2009, and the foundation stone was laid in 2011. Construction slowed down during the COVID-19 pandemic. As of 2022, the building's structure is largely complete but exterior and interior finishes remain to be completed; the cathedral was hoped to be completed in time for the diocese's 50th anniversary in August 2022.

References

External links
Cathedral website

Anglican cathedrals in Uganda
Buildings and structures in Kampala
20th-century churches in Uganda